Louisiana Highway 24 (LA 24) is a state highway located in southeastern Louisiana.  It runs  in a general east–west direction from LA 20 in Schriever to LA 3235 in Larose.

The route has two distinct sections, the longer of which travels through Terrebonne Parish on either side of Bayou Terrebonne.  It serves as the main highway through the city of Houma, which is also the parish seat.  This portion of the highway is bannered east–west, though it runs primarily north–south.  Southeast of Houma, LA 24 does assume an east–west trajectory as it turns away from Bayou Terrebonne and proceeds to the Lafourche Parish community of Larose, located at the junction of Bayou Lafourche and the Gulf Intracoastal Waterway.

LA 24 was designated in the 1955 Louisiana Highway renumbering, its two sections previously bearing different designations—State Route 69 along Bayou Terrebonne and State Route 966 along the Bourg-Larose Highway.  Like many of the region's older rural highways, the former evolved from the natural strip of high ground that formed on the banks of the bayou while the latter was constructed on a man-made embankment by the state highway department in the early 1930s.

Route description

Schriever to Houma
From the west, LA 24 begins at an interchange with LA 20 in Schriever, a small community located just south of Thibodaux.  The interchange is located at a point where LA 20 changes its direction from east to north en route from Gibson to Thibodaux, simultaneously crossing over the BNSF/Union Pacific railroad line.  LA 24 initially heads southeast from the base of the overpass as a standard divided four-lane highway.  After a short distance, the travel lanes divide onto the one-way pair of West Main Street (eastbound) and West Park Avenue (westbound) to run on either side of Bayou Terrebonne.

While traveling from Schriever through the neighboring areas of Magnolia, Gray, and Bayou Cane, LA 24 intersects several other routes that follow parallel bayous.  These include LA 311 (Little Bayou Black), LA 316 (Bayou Blue), and LA 660 (Bayou Little Coteau).  During this stretch, LA 24 also passes through a diamond interchange with US 90 at exit 202, which connects to Morgan City and New Orleans.  In Bayou Cane, LA 24 intersects LA 3040 (Martin Luther King Boulevard), a parallel four-lane highway and commercial corridor through the city of Houma.

Entering Houma proper, LA 24 turns eastward, maintaining its path flanking Bayou Terrebonne.  The highway passes through the city's historic downtown area and intersects LA 182, the pre-freeway alignment of US 90.  LA 182 runs concurrent with LA 24 for two blocks as it zigzags from Barrow Street onto New Orleans Boulevard.  Eastbound LA 182 still provides the most direct connection from Downtown Houma toward New Orleans, as US 90 now bypasses the city.  Immediately east of New Orleans Boulevard, LA 24 crosses a high-level twin-span bridge over the Gulf Intracoastal Waterway.  Returning to grade, LA 24 narrows to an undivided two-lane highway, as Main Street begins to carry two-way traffic at an intersection with LA 57 (Grand Caillou Road).  At this point, westbound LA 24 traffic crosses from the south side of Bayou Terrebonne to the north side by way of a vertical lift bridge at the LA 57 junction.  Park Avenue continues downstream as LA 659, also carrying two-way traffic across the bayou from LA 24.

East Houma to Larose
Continuing through East Houma, LA 24 bends to the southeast with Bayou Terrebonne.  An intersection with LA 3087 (Prospect Boulevard) provides a connection with LA 182 north of the city.  While passing alongside the Houma-Terrebonne Airport, LA 24 begins to follow Bayou Petit Caillou, which branches off of Bayou Terrebonne.  In an area known as Presquille, LA 56 picks up this route, while LA 24 makes a zigzag across both Bayous Petit Caillou and Terrebonne, exiting the Houma city limits, to assume the path of LA 659.  Passing through the community of Bourg, LA 24 intersects LA 316 and crosses another lift bridge over the Company Canal.  Shortly afterward, LA 24 turns northeast away from Bayou Terrebonne at Klondyke while LA 55 assumes the route southeast toward Montegut.  LA 24 then curves eastward again and crosses from Terrebonne Parish into Lafourche Parish.

Soon after curving northward along the Gulf Intracoastal Waterway, LA 24 enters the unincorporated town of Larose. The highway officially ends at a T-intersection with LA 3235, a wide four-lane divided highway. LA 3235 parallels the two-lane LA 1 southward toward Grand Isle, providing a route for trucks and other through traffic in the area. Straight ahead, a local road continues the path of LA 24 to a junction with LA 1 where the latter crosses the Gulf Intracoastal Waterway.

Route classification and data
LA 24 is classified by the Louisiana Department of Transportation and Development (La DOTD) as an urban principal arterial for the majority of its route. During this stretch, the daily traffic volume peaked at 26,000 vehicles in Houma during 2013. The easternmost portion of the route along the Bourg-Larose Highway, however, is classified as a rural minor arterial with traffic volume reported as low as 6,600 vehicles.

The entirety of LA 24 is part of the Wetlands Cultural Byway in the state-designated system of tourist routes known as the Louisiana Scenic Byways.

History

Pre-1955 route designations
In the original Louisiana Highway system in use prior to 1955, the modern LA 24 was split between two different routes.  The longer portion along Bayou Terrebonne from Schriever to Bourg made up the majority of State Route 69, which also extended northwest to Thibodaux (now part of LA 20) and southeast to Montegut (now part of LA 55).  Route 69 was one of the first 98 state highway routes designated by the Louisiana Legislature in 1921 as part of an act which also created the Louisiana Highway Commission, an early forerunner of the Louisiana Department of Transportation and Development (La DOTD).  Like many of the region's older rural highways, this portion of LA 24 evolved from the strip of high ground that formed naturally on the banks of the bayou.  By contrast, the remainder of LA 24 between Bourg and Larose follows a man-made embankment through swampland that was constructed in 1933 by the Highway Commission.  This portion of the route had been designated as State Route 966 by an act of the state legislature in 1930.

1955 renumbering
Routes 69 and 966 were joined together under the single designation of LA 24 when the Louisiana Department of Highways, the successor to the Highway Commission, renumbered the state highway system in 1955.

With the 1955 renumbering, the state highway department initially categorized all routes into three classes: "A" (primary), "B" (secondary), and "C" (farm-to-market).  This system has since been updated and replaced by a more specific functional classification system.

Subsequent improvements
Since 1955, the most significant change to LA 24 has been the widening of much of the highway to four lanes.  Previously, the designation existed solely on the west side of Bayou Terrebonne between Schriever and Houma.  The opposite roadway, though discontinuous, had been part of the state highway system since 1930 as State Route 965, which became LA 659 in the 1955 renumbering.  In the late 1970s, it was incorporated into the route of LA 24 to carry westbound traffic from Houma north to a point near the present US 90 interchange, which was soon to be constructed.  By the late 1980s, the east bank roadway had been extended and improved to give LA 24 a continuous four-lane corridor between Schriever and Houma.

Many of the other improvements to LA 24 over the years have resulted from the construction and/or replacement of bridges along the route.  In 1970, the western terminus at LA 20 in Schriever was converted from a simple T-intersection to a grade-separated interchange.  This occurred when a four-lane overpass of the Southern Pacific Railroad (now the BNSF/UP) line was constructed on LA 20, moving the route off of what is now Old Schriever Highway, which crossed the tracks at grade.  In 1979, a new bridge running diagonally across Bayou Blue on the Bourg-Larose Highway eliminated a zigzag at that point, straightening the roadway.  In Houma, the two high-level bridges crossing the Gulf Intracoastal Waterway were constructed in 1996, replacing two grade-level movable bridges at the same location.

Additionally, the junction of LA 24 and US 90, the region's main highway, was moved from what is now LA 182 in Downtown Houma to the present freeway interchange near Gray.  The interchange was constructed in 1980, but the freeway existed under the temporary designation of LA 3052 until being completed west to Morgan City in 1999.

Most recently, the eastern terminus of LA 24 was slightly truncated in 2015 when the final  of the route were transferred to Lafourche Parish.  The designation formerly extended past LA 3235 and looped under the West Larose Lift Bridge on LA 1 to intersect that highway at the bridge's eastern approach.  This route forced trucks to navigate a tight right-angle turn immediately after a low clearance crossing under the lift bridge.  The extension of LA 3235 from Galliano to Larose in the early 2000s eliminated this hazard, and signs now direct all through traffic to turn onto LA 3235 to reach LA 1, although the connection to northbound LA 1 is less direct.

Major intersections

See also

References

External links

Maps / GIS Data Homepage, Louisiana Department of Transportation and Development
Wetlands Cultural Byway at Louisiana Scenic Byways

0024
Transportation in Terrebonne Parish, Louisiana
Transportation in Lafourche Parish, Louisiana